Triscaedecia suva is a moth of the family Alucitidae. It was described by Petr Ustjuzhanin, Vasiliy Kovtunovich and Donald Hobern in 2019. It is found in Fiji.

References

Moths described in 2019
Alucitidae